The 2023 Étoile de Bessèges – Tour du Gard is a road cycling stage race that is taking place between 1 and 5 February 2023 almost entirely within the French department of Gard. The race is rated as a category 2.1 event on the 2023 UCI Europe Tour calendar, and is the 53rd edition of the Étoile de Bessèges.

Teams 
Eight of the 18 UCI WorldTeams, eight UCI ProTeams, and four UCI Continental teams make up the 20 teams that are participating in the race. Each team entered a full squad of seven riders, for a total of 140 riders who started the race.

UCI WorldTeams

 
 
 
 
 
 
 
 

UCI ProTeams

 
 
 
 
 
 
 
 

UCI Continental Teams

Route

Stages

Stage 1 
1 February 2022 – Bellegarde to Bellegarde,

Stage 2 
2 February 2022 – Bagard to Aubais, 

The stage was neutralised due to a large crash on a bridge about 22 kilometers from the finish. Therefore, no winner was declared and all classifications remained the same from stage 1 heading into stage 3.

Stage 3 
3 February 2022 – Bessèges to Bessèges,

Stage 4 

Stage 5 
5 February 2022 – Alès to Alès, (ITT)

Classification leadership table 

 On stage 2, Mads Pedersen, who is second in the points classification, will wear the yellow jersey, because first-placed Arnaud De Lie will wear the coral jersey as the leader of the general classification. For the same reason, Andrea Piccolo will wear the white jersey for being second in the young rider classification.

Current classification standings

General classification

Points classification

Mountains classification

Young rider classification

Team classification

Notes

References

External links 
 

2023
Étoile de Bessèges
Étoile de Bessèges
Étoile de Bessèges